Maria Carla Alvarez (born 17 September 1984) is an Argentine former professional racing cyclist. In 2009 and 2016, she was the winner of the Argentine National Road Race Championships.

Major results

2003
 National Road Championships
2nd Time trial
3rd Road race
2004
 3rd Time trial, National Road Championships
2005
 2nd Time trial, National Road Championships
2008
 2nd Time trial, National Road Championships
2009
 1st  Road race, National Road Championships
2011
 2nd Time trial, National Road Championships
2014
 2nd Time trial, National Road Championships
2015
 2nd Time trial, National Road Championships
 6th Overall Tour Femenino de San Luis
1st  Argentine rider classification
2016
 1st  Road race, National Road Championships
 8th Overall Tour Femenino de San Luis

References

External links

1984 births
Living people
Argentine female cyclists
Cyclists from Buenos Aires
21st-century Argentine women